Khlong Maphlap Railway Station is a railway station located in Si Nakhon Subdistrict, Si Nakhon District, Sukhothai. It is located 470.273 km from Bangkok railway station and is a class 3 railway station. It is on the Sawankhalok Branch Line of the Northern Line of the State Railway of Thailand.

Train services 
 Special Express No. 3 Bangkok–Sawankhalok/Sila At

Notes 
 Special Express No. 3 stops at Khlong Maphlap 2 times, the first when going into Sawankhalok, and the second when reversing out of Sawankhalok to Ban Dara Junction.
 Special Express No. 4 does not stop at Khlong Maphlap and goes straight towards Phitsanulok from Ban Dara Junction on the mainline.

References 
 Ichirō, Kakizaki (2010). Ōkoku no tetsuro: tai tetsudō no rekishi. Kyōto: Kyōtodaigakugakujutsushuppankai. 
 Otohiro, Watanabe (2013). Tai kokutetsu yonsenkiro no tabi: shasō fūkei kanzen kiroku. Tōkyō: Bungeisha. 

Railway stations in Thailand